John Iglehart Turnbull (June 30, 1910 – October 20, 1944) was an American lacrosse player and 1965 inductee into the National Lacrosse Hall of Fame. He lends his name to the Jack Turnbull Award, given to the nation's best collegiate attackman.

Biography
Jack Turnbull was born on June 30, 1910, in Baltimore, Maryland. He attended Baltimore Polytechnic Institute (Poly), where he was class president his senior year. He was the captain of Poly's 1926 lacrosse team and played on the football and basketball teams as well. At the age of 18, he performed at the playoffs for the 1928 Olympic games.

Turnbull attended Johns Hopkins University, where he played on the 1932 team. He graduated from Hopkins with a bachelor's degree in engineering after only three years. Turnbull was named an All-American each of his 3 years on the Johns Hopkins Blue Jays men's lacrosse team and is widely regarded as one of the best to ever play the game. At Hopkins, Turnbull also played football and helped establish an ice hockey team.

He was captain of the U.S. lacrosse team during the 1932 Summer Olympics and remained active in sports as a member of the Mount Washington Lacrosse Club. Four years later, he was a member of the U.S. field hockey team at the 1936 Summer Olympics in Berlin, during which he met Adolf Hitler.

Turnbull enlisted in the Maryland National Guard as an aviation cadet and was commissioned as a second lieutenant on June 24, 1940. He was mobilized along with the rest of the Maryland National Guard in February 1941, just prior to the U.S. entry into World War II. During the war he quickly rose in rank, and by 1944 he was a lieutenant colonel. On October 20, 1944 he died of injuries sustained two days earlier, when his B-24 crashed in Belgium after a mid-air collision while returning from a bombing run over Germany.

 Stats are incomplete

See also

National Lacrosse Hall of Fame
Johns Hopkins Blue Jays men's lacrosse

References

External links
 
Lacrosse Hall of Fame Bio
Maryland Military Historical Society
Article about World War II service
High Resolution Photo of Jack Turnbull
USILA 1930 Men’s All-Americans
USILA 1931 Men’s All-Americans
USILA 1932 Men’s All-Americans

1910 births
1944 deaths
Johns Hopkins Blue Jays men's lacrosse players
Lacrosse players from Baltimore
Players of American football from Baltimore
Military personnel from Baltimore
Baltimore Polytechnic Institute alumni
20th-century American engineers
Olympic lacrosse players of the United States
Lacrosse players at the 1932 Summer Olympics
Mount Washington Lacrosse Club players
Johns Hopkins Blue Jays football players
United States Army Air Forces personnel killed in World War II
National Guard (United States) officers
United States Army Air Forces colonels
Olympic field hockey players of the United States
Field hockey players at the 1936 Summer Olympics
Aviators killed in aviation accidents or incidents in Belgium
Aviators killed by being shot down
Victims of aviation accidents or incidents in 1944
Maryland National Guard personnel
Victims of aviation accidents or incidents in Belgium